Amrao Khurd is a small village in the Hafizabad District of Punjab, Pakistan. Word Amrao means noble and Khurd is administrative designations used in India and Pakistan to indicate the smaller segments of a town, village or settlement. It is located at 32°16′01.4″N 73°39′47.3″E with an altitude of 207 meters (679 feet).

It consists of approximately 80 homes and 490 people. Amrao Khurd is bounded by rivers and canals. The major canal that originates from the Chenab River at Qadirabad barrage is just east of the village, and the village is often threatened by floods during the monsoon season. The weather is usually ruthless and intolerable in the summer and winter but is amazing in the autumn and spring. The village is normally dry throughout the year.

History 
A family migrated from Kot Baksh to their lands and settled there. This formed a village named Amrao Khurd. All residents of Amrao Khurd are relatives of each other. Mainly people of Amrao Khurd belong to chattha tribe of jats which are considered descendant of Raja Prithviraj Chauhan, king of Ajmer and Delhi.

Economy 
People of Amrao Khurd are mainly working as farmers. Many people have created fish farms. Some people have also started their own businesses. Some have migrated to cities for jobs. People also went abroad seeking work and are supporting their families.

Education 
Youth literacy rate in Amrao Khurd in high. There is one government primary school in village. Due to no secondary school students mainly go to schools in nearby villages. People who can afford for private schools mainly send their kids to M.H Sufi Foundation, which is located in nearby village of Ramke Chattha. Some families have moved to cities like Lahore and Hafizabad for education of their children. For higher education students have to go to cities.

Transportation 
Nearest railway station is at Alipur Chattha which is about 17 km. There is no bus stop in village. To travel on public bus people have to go to Wazirabad Road which is about 1.6 km form village center. Mainly residents use their private vehicles for travel. Mostly bikes are used but those who can afford use cars as there regular mean of transportation. Residents also own tractors and harvesters. Village is connect to E-3.

Health 
There is no hospital in Amrao Khurd. Residents go to Hafizabad or to Alipur Chattha for regular checkup. Due to lack of facilities and for better consultation often residents have to visit doctors in Gujranwala or Lahore. There are about 3-4 doctors in Village but are working in cities or abroad.

Religion 
All residents of Amrao Khurd are Muslims. Residents practice Islam on regular basis. A Jamia Masjid is located in center of village.

Facilities 
Each home in village has electricity connection and in 2017 government gave connection Sui gas to each home of village. All roads in village were revamped and paved before 2018 election. Yet there is no proper sewerage management facility though government has constructed a drain which transport rain and waste water to a nullah which passes through side of village.

References 

Villages in Hafizabad District
Hafizabad District